Elijah Brigham (July 7, 1751 – February 22, 1816) was a U.S. Representative from Massachusetts.

Brigham was born in Westborough (now Northborough) in the Province of Massachusetts Bay, son of Colonel Levi Brigham and Susanna (Grout) Brigham.  He was a descendant of Thomas Brigham and Edmund Rice, early immigrants to Massachusetts Bay Colony.  Brigham was graduated from Dartmouth College, Hanover, New Hampshire, in 1778.
He studied law, but did not practice.
He engaged in mercantile pursuits at Westborough.
He served as member of the State house of representatives 1791–1793.
He served as justice of the court of common pleas 1795–1811.
He served in the State senate in 1796, 1798 from 1801 to 1805, and 1807–1810.
He served as a state councilor in 1799, 1800, and 1806.

Brigham was elected as a Federalist to the Twelfth, Thirteenth, and Fourteenth Congresses and served from March 4, 1811, until his death in Washington, D.C., February 22, 1816.
He was interred in the Congressional Cemetery.

Brigham was elected a member of the American Antiquarian Society in 1813.

See also
List of United States Congress members who died in office (1790–1899)

References

External links

1751 births
1816 deaths
Massachusetts state senators
Members of the Massachusetts House of Representatives
Dartmouth College alumni
People from Northborough, Massachusetts
Burials at the Congressional Cemetery
Federalist Party members of the United States House of Representatives from Massachusetts
Members of the American Antiquarian Society
People of colonial Massachusetts